Spirit Lake is a lake in the western United States, located in  Kootenai County in northern Idaho.

According to tradition, Spirit Lake received its name from the spirit of a heartbroken Native American woman whose drowning in the lake was intentional.

The city of Spirit Lake is on a narrow arm of the lake, on its northeast shore.

See also

 List of lakes of Idaho
 List of dams and reservoirs in Idaho

References

Lakes of Idaho
Lakes of Kootenai County, Idaho